Paris Saint-Germain Football Club was founded in 1970. Since that time, PSG has competed in numerous nationally and internationally organised tournaments, and 492 players have played in at least one match with the club's first team. 147 of these players have graduated from the Paris Saint-Germain Academy.

The list below features all players who have played in fewer than 25 matches in official competitions for Paris Saint-Germain. Most notably, it includes global icon David Beckham. PSG signed him in January 2013. At 37 years of age, it was one last challenge for the English superstar, who had enjoyed a glittering and successful career at Manchester United, Real Madrid and LA Galaxy.

Beckham hanged up his boots after an emotional victory over  Brest at the Parc des Princes in May 2013 which sealed PSG's first Ligue 1 title in 19 years. He was made team captain, receiving a standing ovation from fans, players and staff after the final whistle. Beckham finished his career playing at the highest level, while the club benefited from Beckham's commercial allure.

Key

General

 Appearances and goals are for first-team official games, including those in Ligue 1, Ligue 2, Division 3, Coupe de France, Coupe de la Ligue, Trophée des Champions, UEFA Champions League, UEFA Europa League, UEFA Super Cup, FIFA Club World Cup, and several now-defunct competitions — namely the UEFA Cup Winners' Cup and UEFA Intertoto Cup. Substitute appearances are included.
 Players are listed according to the total number of games played. If two or more players are tied, their rankings are determined as follows:

Table headers

 Player – Nationality, first name and last name.
 Position – Role on the field of play.
 Paris Saint-Germain – Playing career at the club.
 Appearances – Number of games played.
 Goals – Number of goals scored.
 Assists – Number of assists delivered.
 Source – Reference source of the player's information.

Positions and colors

Players

Statistics correct as of match played 29 January 2023. Bold denotes an active player for the club.

16–24 appearances

8–15 appearances

1–7 appearances

References

External links
Official websites
PSG.FR – Site officiel du Paris Saint-Germain
Paris Saint-Germain – Ligue 1
Paris Saint-Germain - UEFA.com

 
Paris Saint-Germain F.C.
Association football player non-biographical articles
Paris Saint-Germain F.C. players